Mohamed Kedir (Amharic: ሞሐመድ ከድር; born September 18, 1954) is a former long-distance runner from Ethiopia, who won the bronze medal in men's 10,000 metres at the 1980 Summer Olympics.

In the 5000 metres final, Kedir still led with 300 metres to go, then Ireland's Eamonn Coghlan passed him. Shortly after that, Kedir moved out to the second lane to let his teammate Miruts Yifter pass him, which Yifter did and sprinted past Coghlan. Moments after moving to the second lane, Kedir fell - apparently because he collided with another Ethiopian runner, Yohannes Mohamed. Having lost his rhythm, Kedir finished in 12th and last place. (See YouTube, 1980 Olympics 5000 metres).Kedir won men's long-distance cross country World Championship in 1982 (see below). His last major international race occurred in Helsinki, Finland, at the 1983 inaugural World Athletics Championships. There he finished ninth at 10,000 metres. (See, for example, the Finnish Broadcasting Corporation YLE's Living Archives / Elävä arkisto, links:  Urheilu / Sports, Yleisurheilu / Athletics, MM-kisat / World Championships, MM-kisat 1983 / World Championships 1983, Suomalaiset lähellä huippua / Finns Near the Top).

International competitions

External links
 
 

1954 births
Living people
Ethiopian male long-distance runners
Olympic athletes of Ethiopia
Olympic bronze medalists for Ethiopia
Athletes (track and field) at the 1980 Summer Olympics
World Athletics Cross Country Championships winners
World Athletics Championships athletes for Ethiopia
Medalists at the 1980 Summer Olympics
Olympic bronze medalists in athletics (track and field)
African Games bronze medalists for Ethiopia
African Games medalists in athletics (track and field)
Athletes (track and field) at the 1978 All-Africa Games
20th-century Ethiopian people
21st-century Ethiopian people